The 1999–2000 NBA season was the Lakers' 52nd season in the National Basketball Association, and 40th season in Los Angeles. It was also the Lakers first season playing in their new arena, the Staples Center, becoming co-tenants with their crosstown rival, the Los Angeles Clippers. During the off-season, the team re-acquired former Lakers forward A.C. Green from the Dallas Mavericks, and signed free agents Ron Harper, Brian Shaw and John Salley. Green won two championships with the Lakers in the 1980s, and Salley won three championships with the Detroit Pistons and the Chicago Bulls. More significantly, the Lakers hired former Bulls coach Phil Jackson, who would go on to help the team win five NBA championships over the course of the next 12 years.

After an 8–4 start to the season, the Lakers won seven consecutive games, then posted a 16-game winning streak between December and January, held a 37–11 record at the All-Star break, posted a 19-game winning streak between February and March, and an 11-game winning streak between March and April, finishing the regular season with 67 wins and 15 losses, the most wins since the 1971–72 team won a franchise-record 69 games. The Lakers clinched the top seed in the playoffs for the 25th time in franchise history and the first in nine years.

Center Shaquille O'Neal averaged 29.7 points, 13.6 rebounds and 3.0 blocks per game, and was almost unanimously named the Most Valuable Player of the regular season, and was also named to the All-NBA First Team, and NBA All-Defensive Second Team. 21-year old shooting guard Kobe Bryant averaged 22.5 points, 6.3 rebounds and 4.9 assists per game, and was named to the All-NBA Second Team, and NBA All-Defensive First Team. In addition, Glen Rice finished third on the team in scoring averaging 15.9 points per game, while Harper provided the team with 7.0 points and 3.4 assists per game, Rick Fox contributed 6.5 points per game off the bench, and Derek Fisher provided with 6.3 points and 2.8 assists per game. On the defensive side, Robert Horry averaged 5.7 points and 4.8 rebounds per game off the bench, and Green contributed 5.0 points and 5.9 rebounds per game. The Lakers had the best team defensive rating in the NBA, with O'Neal and Bryant both finishing within the top 5 of Defensive Player of the Year voting.

In the playoffs, the Lakers were pushed to the limit by the Sacramento Kings, whom they defeated in a deciding fifth game in the Western Conference First Round, before going on to defeat the Phoenix Suns in five games in the Western Conference Semi-finals. In the Western Conference Finals, they defeated a Portland Trail Blazers team featuring Rasheed Wallace, Scottie Pippen and Steve Smith in seven games, before going on to win the NBA Finals 4–2 against the Indiana Pacers, earning the franchise its 12th NBA championship. It was the Lakers' first championship since 1988. It was also Phil Jackson's seventh championship as a head coach, and the first with a team besides the Chicago Bulls.

The season is memorable; 21-year-old Bryant being named to the All-NBA Defensive First Team while emerging as one of the NBA's young superstars, the Lakers signing Harper and Shaw to give the team a veteran presence, and hiring Phil Jackson to give the team a championship experience. Bryant, O'Neal and coach Jackson represented the Western Conference in the 2000 NBA All-Star Game, where O'Neal and Tim Duncan of the San Antonio Spurs were both named co-MVP's. Following the season, Rice and Travis Knight were both traded to the New York Knicks, while Green signed as a free agent with the Miami Heat, and Salley retired after making a comeback.

For the season, the Lakers sported new uniforms adding side panels to their jerseys and shorts, which remained in use until 2004, where they slightly changed their uniforms adding the secondary logo to their shorts.

Because of their dominant regular and postseason performance, as well as O'Neal and Bryant's individual achievements, this Los Angeles Lakers team is widely regarded as one of the greatest teams in NBA history. A documentary miniseries, Birth of a Dynasty, based on this Lakers season, was released in late 2019.

Draft picks

Roster

Regular season

Season standings

Record vs. opponents

Regular Season Summary
The Lakers went 31-19 during the shortened lockout season of 1998-99, good enough to claim the fourth spot of the Western Conference. They cruised past the Rockets on the first round, before bowing down to the eventual champions, the Spurs.

The Lakers started their season without Kobe Bryant, who missed the first month of the regular season due to a preseason hand injury, so Phil Jackson used veteran forwards such as A.C. Green and Glen Rice to fill the void left by Bryant.

November
On November 2, 1999, the Lakers started their season with a 91-84 win on the road against the Utah Jazz. Glen Rice led the Lakers with 28 points to go along with 5 3-pointers made. The very next day, the Lakers got their first win at home after defeating the visiting Vancouver Grizzlies, 103-88, behind Shaquille O'Neal's double-double performance of 28 points and 10 rebounds. It was also the first time that the Lakers played in STAPLES Center. Their first loss of the season came on November 6 when the Lakers were defeated by the home team, Portland Trail Blazers, led by Scottie Pippen. In that game, Shaquille O'Neal led both teams in scoring as he scored 21 points to go along with 10 rebounds and 2 blocks. The next two games, the Lakers were pitted against the Dallas Mavericks led by rising stars Steve Nash and Dirk Nowitzki. They played first at the Lakers homecourt then the next game, on the Mavericks homecourt. However, they were no match for the dominance of O'Neal who averaged 28.5 points per game, 15.0 rebounds per game and 2 blocks per game in those two contests. The Lakers will face the Houston Rockets the next two games, this time, they will face the Rockets first on the road before going home to face the Rockets there. During their first meeting on November 10, the Lakers were pushed to the limit for Shaquille O'Neal was fouled out in the game. He just played 16 minutes for the entire game. However, the Rockets were not able to capitalize the opportunity as the veterans of the Lakers led by Glen Rice's 24 points, powered the Lakers towards their 5th win of the season. They match-up against each other again two days after, but without O'Neal who was suspended, they bowed to the visiting Rockets, 81-97, who was led by Hakeem Olajuwon and Steve Francis. Two days after, the Lakers bounced back because O'Neal was back who dominated the whole game against the visiting Atlanta Hawks. O'Neal recorded 23 points, 11 rebounds, 3 assists and 3 blocks as he led the Lakers towards the win. The Lakers, led by the strong performance of O'Neal, overpowered the home team, Phoenix Suns, who were led by Jason Kidd and former Bulls player, Luc Longley, 91-82. O'Neal recorded 34 points, 18 rebounds, 4 assists and 8 blocks for the Lakers. On November 18, the Lakers were up against the Nick Van Exel-led Nuggets. Van Exel was the former point guard of the Lakers. During the first half, the Lakers were up 42-39. However, the Nuggets stormed back as they got the win, 93-82. It was the Lakers' third loss of the season. Shaquille O'Neal led all scorers with 36 points to go along with 8 rebounds. The Lakers next faced the Chicago Bulls. O'Neal led the Lakers towards their eighth win of the season as they defeat the visiting Bulls, 103-95. O'Neal recorded 41 points, 17 rebounds and 7 blocks. On November 21, the Lakers were up against the Vince Carter-led Toronto Raptors. However, Vince Carter scored 34 points to go along with 13 rebounds as the Raptors take the win in STAPLES Center, 111-102, to give the Lakers their fourth loss of the season. For the Lakers, O'Neal was again the leading scorer with 37 points to go along with 19 rebounds. On their last game for the month in November, the Lakers traveled on the road to match-up against the Gary Payton-led Seattle Supersonics. However, the Lakers just proved too much to be handled as they dispatched the Supersonics, 101-77. They finished the month of November with an 11-4 record.

December
On December 1, 1999, Kobe Bryant was back from almost a month of not playing due to injury, and this time, they were up against the 2-11 Golden State Warriors. Bryant came off the bench to play almost 30 minutes and scored 19 points and grabbed 6 rebounds. O'Neal also contributed 28 points and 23 rebounds as they got the 12th win of the season. Six days later, the Lakers won their 15th game of the season, led by Shaquille O'Neal who recorded 30 points, 16 rebounds and 7 blocks, in a 91-80 win over the visiting Washington Wizards. On December 12, Kobe Bryant scored 26 points and Shaquille O'Neal contributed 22 points and 24 rebounds as the Lakers won their 17th win of the season after beating the visiting Detroit Pistons, 101-93. Two days after, Phil Jackson re-inserted Kobe Bryant into the startling lineup for the first time this season. And now, the Lakers were up against their division rivals, the L.A. Clippers. O'Neal recorded 21 points, 19 rebounds and 3 blocks and Bryant added 18 points as the Lakers dismissed the Clippers, 95-68. On December 17, the Lakers won their fifth straight game as they won on the road against the Timberwolves, 97-88. Kobe Bryant paved the way with 28 points, 7 rebounds and 12 assists. Three days later, Shaquille O'Neal recorded 34 points, 20 rebounds and 2 blocks in a 99-90 win over the home team, Boston Celtics, for the seventh straight win. The next game, the Lakers were visited by the defending champions, the San Antonio Spurs who were led by the "Twin Towers" of Tim Duncan and David Robinson for a Christmas showdown. At halftime, the Lakers led the Spurs, 50-42, before the Spurs surged in the third quarter, outscoring the Lakers, 25-21, cutting the lead to four. However, the Lakers responded in the fourth quarter as they pulled away and won their eighth straight game. Shaquille O'Neal recorded 35 points and 14 rebounds as the Lakers took a narrow win over the visiting Mavericks, 108-106. On their last game of the century and year 1999, the Lakers won their tenth straight game, after defeating the visiting Suns, 103-88, thanks to Shaquille O'Neal's performance of 27 points, 19 rebounds, 7 assists and 5 blocks. For the month of December, the Lakers have a record of 14-1, and they went undefeated at their homecourt.

January
In the first two games of the 21st century (year 2000), the Lakers were up against the Clippers, whom they defeated both games. In the second game, O'Neal recorded 40 points and 19 rebounds for the Lakers. On January 10, Bryant and O'Neal combined for 61 of the 130 points of the Lakers whom they guided towards a win over the visiting Nuggets. It was their 15th straight win The next game, they traveled in Milwaukee in which they recorded their 16th straight win after beating the Bucks, 103-94. Their 16-game winning streak came to an end when the Reggie Miller-led Indiana Pacers beat the Lakers, 111-102. It was their sixth loss of the season. Their seventh loss came against the Seattle Supersonics wherein Gary Payton led the Supersonics towards the win. Following their loss against the Supersonics, in the next 6 games, they have a record of 2 wins and 4 losses, and 3 of the 4 losses came on the road. Their last win for the month of January happened on January 28 wherein the Lakers defeated the visiting Bucks, 117-89.

February
They started the month of February with an 81-105 loss to the defending champions, San Antonio Spurs. The "Twin Towers" proved too much for the Lakers. O'Neal led the Lakers in scoring with 31 points. The next game, the Lakers blows out the visiting Utah Jazz, 113-67. Shaquille O'Neal recorded 25 points, 6 rebounds and 5 blocks to lead the Lakers. It was the tied for the sixth highest point differential in Lakers franchise history. On February 9, the Lakers had another blowout win, this time against the visiting Timberwolves. O'Neal recorded 37 points, 16 rebounds and 4 blocks as the Lakers won 114-81. On February 20, the Lakers escaped the Allen Iverson-led 76ers on the road, 87-84, thus winning their seventh straight game. O'Neal once again led the Lakers with 22 points, 16 rebounds, 9 assists and 4 blocks. During their last game of February, O'Neal and Bryant recorded 55 points of the 90 Laker points as they led the Lakers towards their 12th straight win, escaping the home team, Portland Trail Blazers, 90-87. They ended the month of February with a record of 12-1.

March
On March 1, the Lakers defeated the visiting Vancouver Grizzlies, 103-91, thus winning their 13th straight win. Kobe Bryant led the Lakers in scoring with 27 points to go along with 6 rebounds and 3 assists. Five days later, the Lakers were up against the Clippers, and they won their 16th straight win, 123-103. O'Neal recorded a career-high 61 points to go along with 23 rebounds and 3 assists for the Lakers. They also have won their 50th game of the season. Three days after, Bryant and O'Neal combined for 59 points as they defeated the home team, Golden State Warriors, 109-92, to extend their winning streak to 17 in a row. With that win, the Lakers now have their second longest winning streak in franchise history, after beating their winning streak earlier in the season when they won 16 in a row. They also won 16 in a row back in January to February 1991. On March 12, their winning streak were nearly snapped as they overcame a 12-point deficit against the visiting Sacramento Kings. The Lakers won 109-106. Bryant recorded 40 points, 10 rebounds and 8 assists and O'Neal added 39 points, 20 rebounds and 5 assists. The very next day, O'Neal, Bryant and Rice combined for 82 points as they extend their winning streak to 19 games as they defeat the home team, the Denver Nuggets, 118-108. Their 19-game winning streak was the longest in the NBA for four years when the 1995-96 Bulls won 18 in a row. Their 19-game winning streak ended when they were defeated by the home team, Washington Wizards, 102-109, despite O'Neal's 40 points and 12 rebounds for the Lakers. They got back in the winning column, as they blown out the home team, the Detroit Pistons, 110-82. In that game, they've won their 54th game of the season. O'Neal led the Lakers with 35 points and 11 rebounds. O'Neal again led the Lakers as he recorded 43 points and 10 rebounds as they won again, 92-85, against the home team, New York Knicks. On March 20, O'Neal and Rice combined for 56 of the 100 Lakers points as they got the road win in Miami, 100-89. Bryant also added 23 points and 5 rebounds for the Lakers. On March 26, in a road game against the Sacramento Kings, the Kings jumped out on an early lead, leading the Lakers 50-47 by the end of the first half. However, the Lakers outscored the Kings, 43-37, in the second half, thus winning the game, 90-89. The Lakers now have won their sixth straight game. In their last game for the month of March, the Lakers defeated the visiting 76ers, 100-88. O'Neal led the Lakers with 37 points, 14 rebounds, 5 assists and 8 blocks. The Lakers now have won their 61st game of the season, the first time they have won over 61 games for over a decade. They ended the month of March with a 15-1 win record, only losing to the Washington Wizards.

April
Their first game on April was against the visiting Knicks. O'Neal led the Lakers with 34 points, 12 rebounds, 4 assists and 5 blocks as the Lakers captured their 62nd win of the season, 106-82. On April 5, O'Neal recorded 49 points and 13 rebounds as the Lakers recorded their 64th win of the season as they won on the road, 111-104, against the home team, Golden State Warriors. On April 10, the Lakers captured their 65th win of the season, behind Kobe Bryant's 33 points, 10 rebounds and 6 assist performance for the Lakers, as they escaped the visiting SuperSonics, 106-103. Their 65 wins have matched their 2nd highest win total for a single season in franchise history, matching the 1986-87 Lakers season. Their 67th win of the season came in a 101-95 win over the visiting Timberwolves. O'Neal once again led the Lakers with 33 points, 14 rebounds and 8 assists.

Game log

Pre-season

|-style="background:#bababa"
| 0
| October 12 
| Washington
| Cancelled (stadium structural stability concerns)
| 
| 
| 
| Alltel Arena (Little Rock, AR)
| 0-0
|- style="background:#fcc;"
| 1
| October 13
| Washington
| L 84-88
| 
| 
| 
| Kemper Arena (Kansas City, MO)
| 0-1
|- style="background:#cfc;"
| 2
| October 19
| Golden State
| W 97-90
| 
| 
| 
| San Diego Sports Arena (San Diego, CA)
| 1-1
|- style="background:#cfc;"
| 3
| October 21
| Golden State
| W 93-89 (OT)
| 
| 
| 
| Great Western Forum
| 2-1
|- style="background:#fcc;"
| 4
| October 22
| Phoenix
| L 100-112
| 
| 
| 
| Great Western Forum
| 2-2
|- style="background:#fcc;"
| 5
| October 25
| Portland
| L 78-92
| 
| 
| 
| University Arena (Albuquerque, NM)
| 2-3
|- style="background:#fcc;"
| 6
| October 26
| Phoenix 
| L 73-95
|
| 
| 
| Thomas & Mack Center (Las Vegas, NV)
| 2-4
|- style="background:#fcc;"
| 7
| October 28
| Utah
| L 76-92
| 
| 
| 
| Arrowhead Pond (Anaheim, CA)
| 2-5

Regular season

|- style="background:#cfc;"
| 1
| November 2
| @ Utah
| W 91–84
| Glen Rice (28)
| Shaquille O'Neal (13)
| Derek Fisher (7)
| Delta Center19,911
| 1–0
|- style="background:#cfc;"
| 2
| November 3
| Vancouver
| W 103–88
| Shaquille O'Neal (28)
| Shaquille O'Neal (10)
| Derek Fisher (8)
| Staples Center18,997
| 2–0
|- style="background:#fcc;"
| 3
| November 6
| @ Portland
| L 82–97
| Shaquille O'Neal (21)
| Green & O'Neal  (10)
| Ron Harper (6)
| Rose Garden20,584
| 2–1
|- style="background:#cfc;"
| 4
| November 7
| Dallas
| W 105–97
| Shaquille O'Neal (30)
| Shaquille O'Neal (20)
| Derek Fisher (8)
| Staples Center18,068
| 3–1
|- style="background:#cfc;"
| 5
| November 9
| @ Dallas
| W 123–101
| Shaquille O'Neal (27)
| Shaquille O'Neal (10)
| Brian Shaw (5)
| Reunion Arena17,349
| 4–1
|- style="background:#cfc;"
| 6
| November 10
| @ Houston
| W 89–88
| Glen Rice (24)
| A.C. Green (12)
| Ron Harper (6)
| The Summit16,285
| 5–1
|- style="background:#fcc;"
| 7
| November 12
| Houston
| L 81–97
| Glen Rice (11)
| A.C. Green (9)
| A.C. Green (4)
| Staples Center18,359
| 5–2
|- style="background:#cfc;"
| 8
| November 14
| Atlanta
| W 93–88
| Shaquille O'Neal (23)
| Shaquille O'Neal (11)
| Ron Harper (5)
| Staples Center18,510
| 6–2
|- style="background:#cfc;"
| 9
| November 15
| @ Phoenix
| W 91–82
| Shaquille O'Neal (34)
| Shaquille O'Neal (18)
| Harper & O'Neal (4)
| America West Arena19,023
| 7–2
|- style="background:#fcc;"
| 10
| November 18
| @ Denver
| L 82–93
| Shaquille O'Neal (36)
| A.C. Green (9)
| Derek Fisher (9)
| Pepsi Center15,218
| 7–3
|- style="background:#cfc;"
| 11
| November 19
| Chicago
| W 103–95
| Shaquille O'Neal (41)
| Shaquille O'Neal (17)
| Ron Harper (4)
| Staples Center18,401
| 8–3
|- style="background:#fcc;"
| 12
| November 21
| Toronto
| L 102–111
| Shaquille O'Neal (37)
| Shaquille O'Neal (19)
| Fisher & O'Neal (5)
| Staples Center18,676
| 8–4
|- style="background:#cfc;"
| 13
| November 24
| Utah
| W 90–82
| Shaquille O'Neal (39)
| Shaquille O'Neal (18)
| Harper & O'Neal (4)
| Staples Center18,997
| 9–4
|- style="background:#cfc;"
| 14
| November 26
| New Jersey
| W 103–80
| Shaquille O'Neal (30)
| Shaquille O'Neal (16)
| Shaquille O'Neal (7)
| Staples Center18,997
| 10–4
|- style="background:#cfc;"
| 15
| November 30
| @ Seattle
| W 101–77
| Shaquille O'Neal (27)
| Shaquille O'Neal (10)
| Derek Fisher (8)
| KeyArena17,072
| 11–4

|- style="background:#cfc;"
| 16
| December 1
| Golden State
| W 93–75
| Shaquille O'Neal (28)
| Shaquille O'Neal (23)
| Derek Fisher (4)
| Staples Center17,689
| 12–4
|- style="background:#cfc;"
| 17
| December 3
| Portland
| W 93–80
| Kobe Bryant (23)
| Shaquille O'Neal (16)
| Shaquille O'Neal (6)
| Staples Center18,997
| 13–4
|- style="background:#cfc;"
| 18
| December 5
| Orlando
| W 117–100
| Shaquille O'Neal (27)
| Shaquille O'Neal (10)
| Shaquille O'Neal (7)
| Staples Center18,422
| 14–4
|- style="background:#cfc;"
| 19
| December 7
| Washington
| W 91–80
| Shaquille O'Neal (30)
| Shaquille O'Neal (16)
| Ron Harper (7)
| Staples Center17,571
| 15–4
|- style="background:#fcc;"
| 20
| December 8
| @ Sacramento
| L 91–103
| Bryant & O'Neal (27)
| Shaquille O'Neal (9)
| Kobe Bryant (5)
| ARCO Arena17,317
| 15–5
|- style="background:#cfc;"
| 21
| December 11
| @ Vancouver
| W 106–94
| Shaquille O'Neal (30)
| Shaquille O'Neal (10)
| Kobe Bryant (7)
| General Motors Place14,059
| 16–5
|- style="background:#cfc;"
| 22
| December 12
| Detroit
| W 101–93
| Kobe Bryant (26)
| Shaquille O'Neal (24)
| Kobe Bryant (6)
| Staples Center18,785
| 17–5
|- style="background:#cfc;"
| 23
| December 14
| L.A. Clippers
| W 95–68
| Shaquille O'Neal (21)
| Shaquille O'Neal (19)
| 3 players tied (4)
| Staples Center18,719
| 18–5
|- style="background:#cfc;"
| 24
| December 16
| @ Atlanta
| W 95–88
| Kobe Bryant (30)
| Shaquille O'Neal (13)
| O'Neal & Rice (4)
| Philips Arena19,463
| 19–5
|- style="background:#cfc;"
| 25
| December 17
| @ Minnesota
| W 97–88
| Kobe Bryant (28)
| Shaquille O'Neal (13)
| Kobe Bryant (12)
| Target Center19,354
| 20–5
|- style="background:#cfc;"
| 26
| December 19
| @ Toronto
| W 94–88
| Kobe Bryant (26)
| Shaquille O'Neal (15)
| Glen Rice (4)
| Air Canada Centre19,800
| 21–5
|- style="background:#cfc;"
| 27
| December 20
| @ Boston
| W 99–90
| Shaquille O'Neal (34)
| Shaquille O'Neal (20)
| Bryant & Fox (4)
| Fleet Center18,624
| 22–5
|- style="background:#cfc;"
| 28
| December 25
| San Antonio
| W 99–93
| Shaquille O'Neal (32)
| Shaquille O'Neal (11)
| 3 players tied (5)
| Staples Center18,997
| 23–5
|- style="background:#cfc;"
| 29
| December 27
| Dallas
| W 108–106
| Shaquille O'Neal (35)
| Shaquille O'Neal (14)
| Robert Horry (8)
| Staples Center18,997
| 24–5
|- style="background:#cfc;"
| 30
| December 29
| Phoenix
| W 103–87
| Shaquille O'Neal (27)
| Shaquille O'Neal (19)
| Shaquille O'Neal (7)
| Staples Center18,997
| 25–5

|- style="background:#cfc;"
| 31
| January 4
| @ L.A. Clippers
| W 122–98
| Shaquille O'Neal (38)
| Shaquille O'Neal (15)
| Brian Shaw (7)
| Staples Center20,042
| 26–5
|- style="background:#cfc;"
| 32
| January 5
| L.A. Clippers
| W 118–101
| Shaquille O'Neal (40)
| Shaquille O'Neal (19)
| Brian Shaw (8)
| Staples Center18,788
| 27–5
|- style="background:#cfc;"
| 33
| January 7
| Charlotte
| W 87–83
| Shaquille O'Neal (23)
| Shaquille O'Neal (16)
| Bryant & O'Neal (4)
| Staples Center18,997
| 28–5
|- style="background:#cfc;"
| 34
| January 8
| @ Seattle
| W 110–100
| Kobe Bryant (31)
| Shaquille O'Neal (9)
| Shaquille O'Neal (6)
| KeyArena17,072
| 29–5
|- style="background:#cfc;"
| 35
| January 10
| Denver
| W 130–95
| Shaquille O'Neal (31)
| Shaquille O'Neal (19)
| Shaquille O'Neal (9)
| Staples Center18,997
| 30–5
|- style="background:#cfc;"
| 36
| January 12
| @ Milwaukee
| W 103–94
| Shaquille O'Neal (27)
| Shaquille O'Neal (10)
| Derek Fisher (6)
| Bradley Center18,717
| 31–5
|- style="background:#fcc;"
| 37
| January 14
| @ Indiana
| L 102–111
| Glen Rice (23)
| Shaquille O'Neal (14)
| Ron Harper (7)
| Conseco Fieldhouse18,345
| 31–6
|- style="background:#cfc;"
| 38
| January 15
| @ Minnesota
| W 104–91
| Shaquille O'Neal (26)
| Shaquille O'Neal (19)
| Harper & O'Neal (7)
| Target Center19,767
| 32–6
|- style="background:#fcc;"
| 39
| January 17
| Seattle
| L 81–82
| Shaquille O'Neal (30)
| Kobe Bryant (14)
| Harper & O'Neal (6)
| Staples Center18,997
| 32–7
|- style="background:#cfc;"
| 40
| January 19
| Cleveland
| W 95–86
| Shaquille O'Neal (27)
| Shaquille O'Neal (23)
| Kobe Bryant (4)
| Staples Center18,997
| 33–7
|- style="background:#fcc;"
| 41
| January 22
| Portland
| L 91–95
| Kobe Bryant (28)
| Shaquille O'Neal (16)
| Shaquille O'Neal (7)
| Staples Center18,997
| 33–8
|- style="background:#fcc;"
| 42
| January 24
| @ Utah
| L 101–105 (2OT)
| Shaquille O'Neal (36)
| Shaquille O'Neal (9)
| Ron Harper (8)
| Delta Center19,911
| 33–9
|- style="background:#cfc;"
| 43
| January 28
| Milwaukee
| W 117–89
| Shaquille O'Neal (30)
| Shaquille O'Neal (8)
| Ron Harper (10)
| Staples Center18,997
| 34–9
|- style="background:#fcc;"
| 44
| January 30
| @ Houston
| L 83–89
| Shaquille O'Neal (27)
| Shaquille O'Neal (19)
| Kobe Bryant (5)
| The Summit16,285
| 34–10

|- style="background:#fcc;"
| 45
| February 1
| @ San Antonio
| L 81–105
| Shaquille O'Neal (31)
| Bryant & O'Neal (7)
| Kobe Bryant (8)
| Alamodome25,589
| 34–11
|- style="background:#cfc;"
| 46
| February 4
| Utah
| W 113–67
| Shaquille O'Neal (25)
| A.C. Green (10)
| Kobe Bryant (9)
| Staples Center18,997
| 35–11
|- style="background:#cfc;"
| 47
| February 7
| Denver
| W 106–98
| Shaquille O'Neal (35)
| Shaquille O'Neal (13)
| Kobe Bryant (11)
| Staples Center18,997
| 36–11
|- style="background:#cfc;"
| 48
| February 9
| Minnesota
| W 114–81
| Shaquille O'Neal (37)
| Shaquille O'Neal (16)
| Brian Shaw (7)
| Staples Center18,843
| 37–11
|- align="center"
|colspan="9" bgcolor="#bbcaff"|All-Star Break
|- style="background:#cfc;"
|- bgcolor="#bbffbb"
|- style="background:#cfc;"
| 49
| February 15
| @ Chicago
| W 88–76
| Shaquille O'Neal (29)
| Shaquille O'Neal (20)
| Derek Fisher (6)
| United Center23,208
| 38–11
|- style="background:#cfc;"
| 50
| February 16
| @ Charlotte
| W 92–85
| Kobe Bryant (26)
| Shaquille O'Neal (14)
| Kobe Bryant (6)
| Charlotte Coliseum23,799
| 39–11
|- style="background:#cfc;"
| 51
| February 18
| @ Orlando
| W 107–99 (OT)
| Shaquille O'Neal (39)
| Shaquille O'Neal (16)
| Derek Fisher (8)
| Orlando Arena17,248
| 40–11
|- style="background:#cfc;"
| 52
| February 20
| @ Philadelphia
| W 87–84
| Shaquille O'Neal (22)
| Shaquille O'Neal (16)
| Shaquille O'Neal (9)
| First Union Center21,060
| 41–11
|- style="background:#cfc;"
| 53
| February 22
| @ New Jersey
| W 97–89
| Shaquille O'Neal (35)
| Shaquille O'Neal (13)
| 4 players tied (4)
| Continental Airlines Arena20,049
| 42–11
|- style="background:#cfc;"
| 54
| February 23
| @ Cleveland
| W 116–98
| Kobe Bryant (21)
| Shaquille O'Neal (8)
| Shaquille O'Neal (7)
| Gund Arena20,562
| 43–11
|- style="background:#cfc;"
| 55
| February 25
| Boston
| W 109–96
| Shaquille O'Neal (28)
| Shaquille O'Neal (15)
| Ron Harper (7)
| Staples Center18,997
| 44–11
|- style="background:#cfc;"
| 56
| February 27
| Houston
| W 101–85
| Kobe Bryant (31)
| Shaquille O'Neal (13)
| Shaquille O'Neal (8)
| Staples Center18,997
| 45–11
|- style="background:#cfc;"
| 57
| February 29
| @ Portland
| W 90–87
| Shaquille O'Neal (23)
| Shaquille O'Neal (10)
| Robert Horry (5)
| Rose Garden20,584
| 46–11

|- style="background:#cfc;"
| 58
| March 1
| Vancouver
| W 103–91
| Kobe Bryant (27)
| Shaquille O'Neal (17)
| O'Neal & Shaw (5)
| Staples Center18,912
| 47–11
|- style="background:#cfc;"
| 59
| March 3
| Indiana
| W 107–92
| Shaquille O'Neal (31)
| Shaquille O'Neal (15)
| Kobe Bryant (7)
| Staples Center18,997
| 48–11
|- style="background:#cfc;"
| 60
| March 5
| Miami
| W 93–80
| Glen Rice (23)
| Shaquille O'Neal (11)
| Shaquille O'Neal (7)
| Staples Center18,997
| 49–11
|- style="background:#cfc;"
| 61
| March 6
| @ L.A. Clippers
| W 123–103
| Shaquille O'Neal (61)
| Shaquille O'Neal (23)
| 3 players tied (5)
| Staples Center20,385
| 50–11
|- style="background:#cfc;"
| 62
| March 9
| @ Golden State
| W 109–92
| Kobe Bryant (30)
| Shaquille O'Neal (13)
| Bryant & Fisher (4)
| The Arena in Oakland20,136
| 51–11
|- style="background:#cfc;"
| 63
| March 12
| Sacramento
| W 109–106
| Kobe Bryant (40)
| Shaquille O'Neal (20)
| Kobe Bryant (8)
| Staples Center18,997
| 52–11
|- style="background:#cfc;"
| 64
| March 13
| @ Denver
| W 118–108
| Shaquille O'Neal (40)
| Bryant & O'Neal (9)
| Shaquille O'Neal (7)
| Pepsi Center19,099
| 53–11
|- style="background:#fcc;"
| 65
| March 16
| @ Washington
| L 102–109
| Shaquille O'Neal (40)
| Shaquille O'Neal (12)
| Kobe Bryant (7)
| MCI Center20,674
| 53–12
|- style="background:#cfc;"
| 66
| March 17
| @ Detroit
| W 110–85
| Shaquille O'Neal (35)
| Shaquille O'Neal (11)
| Kobe Bryant (6)
| The Palace of Auburn Hills22,076
| 54–12
|- style="background:#cfc;"
| 67
| March 19
| @ New York
| W 92–85
| Shaquille O'Neal (43)
| Shaquille O'Neal (10)
| Kobe Bryant (7)
| Madison Square Garden19,763
| 55–12
|- style="background:#cfc;"
| 68
| March 20
| @ Miami
| W 100–89
| O'Neal & Rice (28)
| Shaquille O'Neal (12)
| Kobe Bryant (4)
| American Airlines Arena20,075
| 56–12
|- style="background:#cfc;"
| 69
| March 22
| Golden State
| W 119–96
| Shaquille O'Neal (22)
| Travis Knight (10)
| Ron Harper (7)
| Staples Center18,843
| 57–12
|- style="background:#cfc;"
| 70
| March 24
| Phoenix
| W 109–101
| Shaquille O'Neal (40)
| Shaquille O'Neal (14)
| Kobe Bryant (7)
| Staples Center18,997
| 58–12
|- style="background:#cfc;"
| 71
| March 26
| @ Sacramento
| W 90–89
| Shaquille O'Neal (34)
| Kobe Bryant (14)
| Kobe Bryant (4)
| ARCO Arena17,317
| 59–12
|- style="background:#cfc;"
| 72
| March 29
| @ Vancouver
| W 108–99
| Kobe Bryant (28)
| Robert Horry (7)
| Shaquille O'Neal (8)
| General Motors Place16,780
| 60–12
|- style="background:#cfc;"
| 73
| March 31
| Philadelphia
| W 100–88
| Shaquille O'Neal (37)
| Shaquille O'Neal (14)
| 3 players tied (5)
| Staples Center18,997
| 61–12

|- style="background:#cfc;"
| 74
| April 2
| New York
| W 106–82
| Shaquille O'Neal (34)
| Shaquille O'Neal (12)
| Kobe Bryant (8)
| Staples Center18,997
| 62–12
|- style="background:#cfc;"
| 75
| April 4
| @ Phoenix
| W 84–83
| Shaquille O'Neal (32)
| Robert Horry (11)
| Ron Harper (8)
| America West Arena19,023
| 63–12
|- style="background:#cfc;"
| 76
| April 5
| @ Golden State
| W 111–104
| Shaquille O'Neal (49)
| Shaquille O'Neal (13)
| Kobe Bryant (11)
| The Arena in Oakland18,621
| 64–12
|- style="background:#fcc;"
| 77
| April 8
| San Antonio
| L 80–98
| Kobe Bryant (26)
| A.C. Green (9)
| Kobe Bryant (5)
| Staples Center18,997
| 64–13
|- style="background:#cfc;"
| 78
| April 10
| Seattle
| W 106–103 (OT)
| Kobe Bryant (33)
| Kobe Bryant (10)
| Bryant & Shaw (6)
| Staples Center18,997
| 65–13
|- style="background:#cfc;"
| 79
| April 14
| Sacramento
| W 121–114
| Shaquille O'Neal (41)
| Shaquille O'Neal (16)
| Ron Harper (10)
| Staples Center18,997
| 66–13
|- style="background:#cfc;"
| 80
| April 16
| Minnesota
| W 101–95
| Shaquille O'Neal (33)
| Shaquille O'Neal (14)
| Kobe Bryant (10)
| Staples Center18,912
| 67–13
|- style="background:#fcc;"
| 81
| April 18
| @ Dallas
| L 102–112
| Shaquille O'Neal (38)
| Shaquille O'Neal (20)
| Brian Shaw (9)
| Reunion Arena18,190
| 67–14
|- style="background:#fcc;"
| 82
| April 19
| @ San Antonio
| L 98–103 (OT)
| Kobe Bryant (23)
| Brian Shaw (10)
| Brian Shaw (7)
| Alamodome29,447
| 67–15

Playoffs

|- align="center" bgcolor="#ccffcc"
| 1
| April 23
| Sacramento
| W 117–107
| Shaquille O'Neal (46)
| Shaquille O'Neal (17)
| Bryant & Shaw (5)
| Staples Center18,997
| 1–0
|- align="center" bgcolor="#ccffcc"
| 2
| April 27
| Sacramento
| W 113–89
| Kobe Bryant (32)
| Shaquille O'Neal (19)
| Shaquille O'Neal (6)
| Staples Center18,997
| 2–0
|- align="center" bgcolor="#ffcccc"
| 3
| April 30
| @ Sacramento
| L 91–99
| Kobe Bryant (35)
| Shaquille O'Neal (17)
| Ron Harper (4)
| ARCO Arena17,317
| 2–1
|- align="center" bgcolor="#ffcccc"
| 4
| May 2
| @ Sacramento
| L 88–101
| Kobe Bryant (32)
| Shaquille O'Neal (16)
| Bryant & Harper (4)
| ARCO Arena17,317
| 2–2
|- align="center" bgcolor="#ccffcc"
| 5
| May 5
| Sacramento
| W 113–86
| Shaquille O'Neal (32)
| Shaquille O'Neal (18)
| Bryant & Rice (6)
| Staples Center18,997
| 3–2

|- align="center" bgcolor="#ccffcc"
| 1
| May 7
| Phoenix
| W 105–77
| Shaquille O'Neal (37)
| Shaquille O'Neal (14)
| Brian Shaw (4)
| Staples Center18,997
| 1–0
|- align="center" bgcolor="#ccffcc"
| 2
| May 10
| Phoenix
| W 97–96
| Shaquille O'Neal (38)
| Shaquille O'Neal (20)
| Kobe Bryant (6)
| Staples Center18,997
| 2–0
|- align="center" bgcolor="#ccffcc"
| 3
| May 12
| @ Phoenix
| W 105–99
| Shaquille O'Neal (37)
| Shaquille O'Neal (17)
| Horry & Shaw (4)
| America West Arena19,023
| 3–0
|- align="center" bgcolor="#ffcccc"
| 4
| May 14
| @ Phoenix
| L 98–117
| Shaquille O'Neal (24)
| Horry & O'Neal (9)
| Kobe Bryant (5)
| America West Arena19,023
| 3–1
|- align="center" bgcolor="#ccffcc"
| 5
| May 16
| Phoenix
| W 87–65
| Kobe Bryant (17)
| Shaquille O'Neal (21)
| Brian Shaw (4)
| Staples Center18,997
| 4–1

|- align="center" bgcolor="#ccffcc"
| 1
| May 20
| Portland
| W 109–94
| Shaquille O'Neal (41)
| Shaquille O'Neal (11)
| Shaquille O'Neal (7)
| Staples Center18,997
| 1–0
|- align="center" bgcolor="#ffcccc"
| 2
| May 22
| Portland
| L 77–106
| Shaquille O'Neal (23)
| Shaquille O'Neal (12)
| 3 players tied (4)
| Staples Center18,997
| 1–1
|- align="center" bgcolor="#ccffcc"
| 3
| May 26
| @ Portland
| W 93–91
| Shaquille O'Neal (26)
| Shaquille O'Neal (12)
| Kobe Bryant (7)
| Rose Garden Arena20,135
| 2–1
|- align="center" bgcolor="#ccffcc"
| 4
| May 28
| @ Portland
| W 103–91
| Shaquille O'Neal (25)
| Shaquille O'Neal (11)
| Kobe Bryant (7)
| Rose Garden Arena20,209
| 3–1
|- align="center" bgcolor="#ffcccc"
| 5
| May 30
| Portland
| L 88–96
| Shaquille O'Neal (31)
| Shaquille O'Neal (21)
| Robert Horry (5)
| Staples Center18,997
| 3–2
|- align="center" bgcolor="#ffcccc"
| 6
| June 2
| @ Portland
| L 93–103
| Kobe Bryant (33)
| Shaquille O'Neal (11)
| Robert Horry (7)
| Rose Garden Arena20,340
| 3–3
|- align="center" bgcolor="#ccffcc"
| 7
| June 4
| Portland
| W 89–84
| Kobe Bryant (25)
| Kobe Bryant (11)
| Kobe Bryant (7)
| Staples Center18,997
| 4–3

|- align="center" bgcolor="#ccffcc"
| 1
| June 7
| Indiana
| W 104–87
| Shaquille O'Neal (43)
| Shaquille O'Neal (19)
| Bryant & Harper (5)
| Staples Center18,997
| 1–0
|- align="center" bgcolor="#ccffcc"
| 2
| June 9
| Indiana
| W 111–104
| Shaquille O'Neal (40)
| Shaquille O'Neal (24)
| Brian Shaw (7)
| Staples Center18,997
| 2–0
|- align="center" bgcolor="#ffcccc"
| 3
| June 11
| @ Indiana
| L 91–100
| Shaquille O'Neal (33)
| Shaquille O'Neal (13)
| Derek Fisher (10)
| Conseco Fieldhouse18,345
| 2–1
|- align="center" bgcolor="#ccffcc"
| 4
| June 14
| @ Indiana
| W 120–118 (OT)
| Shaquille O'Neal (36)
| Shaquille O'Neal (21)
| Kobe Bryant (5)
| Conseco Fieldhouse18,345
| 3–1
|- align="center" bgcolor="#ffcccc"
| 5
| June 16
| @ Indiana
| L 87–120
| Shaquille O'Neal (35)
| Shaquille O'Neal (11)
| Ron Harper (5)
| Conseco Fieldhouse18,345
| 3–2
|- align="center" bgcolor="#ccffcc"
| 6
| June 19
| Indiana
| W 116–111
| Shaquille O'Neal (41)
| Shaquille O'Neal (12)
| Ron Harper (9)
| Staples Center18,997
| 4–2

Playoffs

Western Conference first round

(1) Los Angeles Lakers vs. (8) Sacramento Kings
Last Playoff Meeting: 1984 Western Conference First Round (Los Angeles won 3-0; Kings were in Kansas City, Missouri)

In Game 1, the Lakers started the game strong, outscoring the visiting Kings, 65-55, at halftime. The Lakers carried this momentum all the way towards the second half, thus winning Game 1 of the series. O'Neal led the Lakers with 46 points, 17 rebounds and 4 blocks. Bryant added 23 points, 7 rebounds and 5 assists for the Lakers. Shaquille O'Neal became the first player to record that statline since Hakeem Olajuwon back in 1987. He also became the first Lakers player to have done that since Kareem Abdul-Jabbar recorded 45 points and 18 rebounds back in 1977.

In Game 2, the Lakers were once again dominant, outscoring the visiting Kings in every quarter. Kobe Bryant led the Lakers with 32 points and 4 rebounds. O'Neal added 23 points, 19 rebounds, 6 assists and 3 blocks for the Lakers.

In Game 3, the series now shifted in Sacramento, wherein the Kings now host the Lakers. Up 2-0 in the series, the Lakers lead the Kings, 51-46, at halftime. The Lakers maintained that lead until the end of the third quarter. However, the Kings outscored the Lakers 33-20 during the fourth quarter, thus winning against the visiting Lakers. Kobe Bryant led all players in terms of scoring with 35 points for the Lakers.

In Game 4, the Kings opened up their largest lead of the series in the first half, leading the visiting Lakers, 56-45, at halftime. Despite the Lakers outscoring the Kings in the third quarter, the Kings responded in the fourth quarter, thus the Lakers lost again on the road, 88-101. Kobe Bryant once again led all players in scoring with 32 points to go along with 6 rebounds.

With the Kings winning in Game 4, this sets up for a winner-take-all Game 5 back in Los Angeles. The Lakers, determined to avenge their losses, blew out the visiting Kings, 113-86, thus advancing to the next round. Shaquille O'Neal led the Lakers with 32 points, 18 rebounds and 4 assists.

Western Conference semifinals

(1) Los Angeles Lakers vs. (5) Phoenix Suns
Last Playoff Meeting: 1993 Western Conference First Round (Phoenix won 3-2)

Western Conference finals

(1) Los Angeles Lakers vs. (3) Portland Trail Blazers
Last Playoff Meeting: 1998 Western Conference First Round (Los Angeles won 3-1)

NBA Finals

 Lakers' backup center John Salley became the first player in NBA history to play on three different championship-winning franchises, as he won titles in 1989 and '90 with the Detroit Pistons and 1996 with the Chicago Bulls.
 This was the Lakers first NBA Finals in the new Staples Center.
 After closing out game 6, fans rioted outside Staples Center by making bonfires, tipping cars, breaking windows of cars and buildings, and vandalizing businesses around the area. Overall, they caused $1 million in damages. In Lakers' championship run the following year, the LAPD came out in bigger force after the Lakers won and prevented the same thing from happening again.
 Staples Center, which was a first-year building in 2000, had a very tricky shooting background and opposing teams often had difficulty shooting there. Pacers coach Larry Bird wanted to have a shoot-around in the arena the day before Game 6 to help his team shoot more consistently because they shot very poorly in Games 1 and 2. However, the Pacers couldn't practice in the building because of an Arena Football game. Bird was very upset about this, and his team had to go down to the Lakers practice facility in El Segundo.
 The two arenas in this series, Conseco Fieldhouse and Staples Center, were both first-year arenas.

Summary
The following scoring summary is written in a line score format, except that the quarter numbers are replaced by game numbers.

Aspects
Although the Lakers were one of the more talented teams in the NBA the previous year, they failed to win a single game against the San Antonio Spurs in the 1999 NBA playoffs. Twenty-four days after being swept by the eventual league champion, the Lakers signed Phil Jackson as head coach. Jackson, famous for coaching Michael Jordan and the six-time champion Chicago Bulls, would build his triangle offense around Shaquille O'Neal and Kobe Bryant. General Manager Jerry West surrounded O'Neal and Bryant with effective role players such as Glen Rice, Ron Harper (who had experience with Jackson's triangle offense as part of the '96–'98 Bulls), and A. C. Green (member of the last two Lakers championship teams).

Along with these starters, the Lakers also possessed a strong bench. Robert Horry not only had championship experience with the Houston Rockets but also was a threat on the perimeter and a defensive star. Derek Fisher was a defensively minded point-guard with the ability to shoot well from long range. Rick Fox, acquired after being released by the Boston Celtics, was the Lakers' sixth man. With a healthy O'Neal, the Lakers dominated the regular season, with winning streaks of 11, 16, and 19 en route to a 67–15 record, tying the 1992 Chicago Bulls and 1986 Boston Celtics as the fifth best record in NBA regular season history.

Although many expected the Lakers to reach the Finals, the road would be a rocky one. In the first round, the Lakers won the first two games against the Sacramento Kings, only to drop the next two games in Sacramento. The Lakers then defeated Sacramento in Game 5, 113–86, to face the Phoenix Suns in the conference semifinals. The Lakers clobbered the Suns, winning the series 4–1 (with their only loss coming in Game 4). In Game 1 of the Western Conference Finals against the Portland Trail Blazers, Rasheed Wallace earned two technical fouls and was ejected; the Lakers took advantage of Wallace's absence and secured victory. The Trail Blazers stormed back in the next game, giving the Lakers their worst home loss of the season in a 106–77 shellacking. This setback did not affect Los Angeles, as they assembled a 3–1 series lead by winning the next two games in Portland. The Lakers underestimated the Trail Blazers, however. Led by former Jackson linchpin Scottie Pippen, Portland won back-to-back elimination games and forced a series-deciding Game 7. Amid several controversial foul calls by referee Dick Bavetta against members of the Trail Blazers, Portland relinquished a 75–60 fourth quarter lead. Rallying back with a 25–4 run, the Lakers won the game and secured a berth in the NBA Finals.

In the 1997–1998 NBA season, the Chicago Bulls narrowly defeated the Pacers, 4 games to 3, in the Eastern Conference Finals. The 1998–1999 NBA season began with a lockout but saw Indiana return to the Eastern Conference Finals, where they fell to the New York Knicks. The 1999–2000 NBA season brought several major changes to the Pacers. It was their first season at Conseco Fieldhouse, as well as their first since 1993 without center Antonio Davis, who was traded for the rights to the No. 5 overall pick in the 1999 NBA Draft. Jalen Rose replaced Chris Mullin in the starting line up, winning the NBA Most Improved Player award, while Austin Croshere replaced him as the sixth man.

The Pacers started the season 7–7 but eventually finished with an Eastern Conference best 56–26 record, including a franchise-best 25 game win streak at home. The Pacers, like the Lakers, struggled in the playoffs. They needed a clutch Travis Best three-pointer to dispatch the Milwaukee Bucks in five games. Indiana faced the Philadelphia 76ers in the second round and took the series in six games, earning a trip to the Eastern Conference Finals. The Pacers would face their rival Knicks, winning a memorable six game series in a reversal of fortunes from years past. With the victory, Indiana advanced to the first NBA Finals in franchise history, becoming the second former ABA team to do so.

Game 1
Wednesday, June 7, 2000, 9:00 at the Staples Center.

The Lakers dominated from the start. The Lakers shot 15-for-20 (75%) in the first period while the Pacers shot only 7-for-20 (35%). Miller would miss all of his shots in the first quarter to give the Lakers a 15-point lead. Croshere came off the bench to keep the Pacers alive in the 2nd quarter, scoring 9 points and grabbing 4 rebounds in the quarter. Although the Pacers attempted a comeback in the 2nd quarter, they were still down by 12. In the 3rd quarter, it would be Jackson who led the Pacers to a comeback, cutting the Lakers lead by 2. Miller also hit his first field goal in the 3rd quarter, though it would be his last. The Lakers handled the Pacers in the final quarter, with a 13–2 run winning by 17 points. O'Neal scored 43 points and grabbed 19 rebounds.

Game 2
Friday, June 9, 2000, 9:00 at the Staples Center.

Los Angeles and Indiana were evenly matched for the first quarter, both scoring 28. However, Los Angeles suffered a major setback when Kobe Bryant left the game in the 2nd quarter due to a sprained ankle and did not return. Jalen Rose later admitted that he intentionally stuck out his foot when Kobe shot a jumpshot in order to trip him when he landed. Ron Harper went in for Bryant and scored 21 points for the game. Desperate to try to gain the lead, Larry Bird resorted to the "Hack-a-Shaq" strategy.  Shaq shot 39 free throws, making only 18, an NBA record for most free throws attempted. Despite this low percentage, Shaq made 9 of 16 in the 4th quarter to keep a Lakers lead. The Pacers cut the lead to 99–96 and were looking to foul Shaq, but when Shaq got the ball he passed to Robert Horry who converted not only the layup, but the foul shot as well giving them a 102–96 lead en route to a 111–104 Lakers victory.

Game 3
Sunday, June 11, 2000, 7:30 at the Conseco Fieldhouse.

Taking advantage of Kobe Bryant's ankle injury, Indiana restored a semblance of parity to the proceedings. Kobe's absence was felt as the Pacers had an 11–2 run in the first quarter to take an 8-point lead. Austin Croshere once again had another huge 2nd quarter, scoring 8 points as the Pacers shot 61% from the field. The Lakers tried to make a run to get back into the game, but upon doings so, Indiana answered with 12 straight points and led by 17. The Lakers were desperate and attempted another run to get within 3 points, but Reggie Miller nailed all his free throws at the end of the game to give Indiana a 9-point win.

Game 4
Wednesday, June 14, 2000, 9:00 at the Conseco Fieldhouse.

The Pacers took a quick 9–2 lead due to Rik Smits hitting his first four shots. Kobe Bryant attempted to play with his sore ankle but only managed to score 6 points in the first half. Even though Bryant and O'Neal were in foul trouble in the first half (each picking up his third with 5 minutes remaining in the second quarter), Indiana could not take advantage and did not extend their lead. This would be a problem as Kobe Bryant scored 10 points and the Lakers took a 62–60 lead due to a Glen Rice three-pointer. The game remained close going into the fourth quarter, when O'Neal and Reggie Miller scored 14 and 13 points respectively, sending the game into overtime. Midway through overtime, O'Neal committed his sixth foul but 21-year-old Bryant delivered three clutch shots, as the Lakers were able to overcome back-up center John Salley's inability to effectively defend Smits. Smits and Miller scored all 14 of Indiana's OT points, but it was not enough to overcome as Miller missed a last-second three-pointer, and L.A. was able to pull one out in Indianapolis.

Game 5
Friday, June 16, 2000, 9:00 at the Conseco Fieldhouse.

Reggie Miller and the Pacers dominated the game from the start in what would be Larry Bird's last game as a coach in the state of Indiana. Reggie Miller came out and made 5 straight shots including a 4-point play. The Pacers hit their first 6 three point shots in the game. The Pacers would have a 20-point lead in the 2nd quarter, and eventually won by 33 – it was the worst Lakers NBA Finals loss since the 148–114 loss to Boston in the 1985 NBA Finals, known as the "Memorial Day Massacre."

With their loss in Game 5, the Lakers record in close-out games dropped to 3–6 in the 2000 NBA Playoffs (the other losses coming in Games 3 and 4 in the first round against Sacramento, Game 4 in the series against Phoenix, and Games 5 and 6 versus Portland). As a result, the series returned to California.

Game 6
Monday, June 19, 2000, 9:00 at the Staples Center.

After the two teams traded blows in the first quarter, Mark Jackson concluded the period with a turn-around half-court shot at the buzzer to give the Pacers a 26–24 advantage. They would not relinquish their lead until the fourth quarter. In the first half, the Pacers would lead by as many as twelve points. However, the Lakers chipped away and entered intermission trailing 56–53. Indiana, however, added two more points to their lead, and entered the final period in a position to force a decisive seventh game.

In the fourth quarter, the momentum shifted. The Lakers got four timely three-pointers from Derek Fisher, Robert Horry, and Rick Fox. The turning point occurred on a play where Brian Shaw stole the ball from Jalen Rose, leading to a fast break where Shaquille O'Neal hit an off-balance shot to give the Lakers the lead. The Pacers never led after that point.

The Lakers would build a seven-point lead, but the Pacers fought back to tie the score at 103. After a timeout, the Lakers scored six unanswered points to regain control. The Pacers made one final valiant effort, but it fell short and the Lakers clinched their first championship in twelve years. Shaquille O'Neal led all scorers with 41 points and also pulled down 12 rebounds. He was awarded the Finals MVP.

Player statistics

Season

Playoffs

Award winners
 Shaquille O'Neal, NBA Most Valuable Player
 Shaquille O'Neal, All-NBA First Team
 Kobe Bryant, All-NBA Second Team
 Kobe Bryant, NBA All-Defensive First Team
 Shaquille O'Neal, NBA All-Defensive Second Team
 Shaquille O'Neal, NBA Finals Most Valuable Player

Transactions
The Lakers have been involved in the following transactions during the 1999–2000 season.

Trades

Briefly, the Lakers considered to trade Kobe Bryant for Grant Hill, but it never came close to consummation.

Additions

Subtractions

Player Transactions Citation:

References

 Lakers on Database Basketball
 Lakers on Basketball Reference
 

Los Angeles Lakers seasons
Los Angeles Lakers
NBA championship seasons
Western Conference (NBA) championship seasons
Los Angle
Los Angle